Arbutus pavarii is a species of plant in the heath family. It is endemic to Libya's Jebel Akhdar range in coastal Cyrenaica.

References

pavarii
Endemic flora of Libya
Vulnerable flora of Africa
Plants described in 1936
Taxonomy articles created by Polbot